The kirpan (Punjabi: ਕਿਰਪਾਨ) is a curved, single-edged blade that Khalsa Sikhs are required to wear as part of their religious uniform (The 5 K's), as prescribed by the Sikh Code of Conduct. It is commonly manifested as a dagger or knife in the present-day. Traditionally, the kirpan was a full-sized talwar sword around 30 inches in length. However, British colonial policies and laws introduced in the 19th century reduced the length of the blade. According to the Sikh Rehat Maryada, "The length of the sword to be worn is not prescribed". The sword was traditionally over 3 feet long. It is part of a religious commandment given by Guru Gobind Singh in 1699, founding the Khalsa order and introducing the five articles of faith (the five Ks) which must be worn at all times, the kirpan being one of five Ks.

Etymology 
The Punjabi word ਕਿਰਪਾਨ, kirpān, has a folk etymology with two roots: kirpa, meaning "mercy", "grace", "compassion" or "kindness"; and aanaa, meaning "honor", "grace" or "dignity". It is derived from or related to Sanskrit कृपाण (kṛpaṇa, “sword, dagger, sacrificial knife”), ultimately from the Proto-Indo-European stem *kerp-, from *(s)ker, meaning "to cut".

Purpose 
Sikhs are expected to embody the qualities of a Sant Sipahi or "saint-soldier", showing no fear on the battlefield and treating defeated enemies humanely. The Bhagat further defines the qualities of a sant sipahi as one who is "truly brave...who fights for the deprived".

Kirpans are curved and have a single cutting edge that should be sharp. They vary in size and a Sikh who has undergone the Amrit Sanskar ceremony of initiation may carry more than one; the Kirpans must be made of steel or iron.

History

Sikhism was founded in the 15th century in the Punjab region of medieval India. At the time of its founding, this culturally rich region was governed by the Mughal Empire. During the time of the founder of the Sikh faith and its first guru, Guru Nanak, Sikhism flourished as a counter to both the prevalent Hindu and Muslim teachings. The Mughal emperor Akbar focused on religious tolerance. His relationship with Sikh Gurus was cordial.

The relationship between the Sikhs and Akbar's successor Jehangir was not friendly. Later Mughal rulers reinstated shari'a traditions of jizya, a poll tax on non-Muslims. The Guru Arjan Dev, the fifth guru, refused to remove references to Muslim and Hindu teachings in the Adi Granth and was summoned and executed.

This incident is seen as a turning point in Sikh history, leading to the first instance of militarization of Sikhs under Guru Arjun's son Guru Hargobind. Guru Arjan Dev explained to the five Sikhs who accompanied him to Lahore, that Guru Hargobind has to build a defensive army to protect the people. Guru Hargobind trained in shashtar vidya, a form of martial arts that became prevalent among the Sikhs. He first conceptualized the idea of the kirpan through the notion of Sant Sipahi, or "saint soldiers".

The relationship between the Sikhs and the Mughals further deteriorated following the execution of the ninth Guru Tegh Bahadur by Aurengzeb, who was highly intolerant of Sikhs, partially driven by his desire to impose Islamic law. Following the executions of their leaders and facing increasing persecution, the Sikhs officially adopted militarization for self-protection by creating later on the Khalsa; the executions also prompted formalization of various aspects of the Sikh faith. The tenth and final guru, Guru Gobind Singh formally included the kirpan as a mandatory article of faith for all baptised Sikhs, making it a duty for Sikhs to be able to defend the needy, suppressed ones, to defend righteousness and the freedom of expression.

Legality
In modern times there has been debate about allowing Sikhs to carry a kirpan that falls under prohibitions on bladed weapons, with some countries allowing Sikhs a dispensation.

Other issues not strictly of legality arise, such as whether to allow carrying of kirpans on commercial aircraft or into areas where security is enforced.

Belgium
On 12 October 2009, the Antwerp court of appeal declared carrying a kirpan a religious symbol, overturning a €550 fine from a lower court for "carrying a freely accessible weapon without demonstrating a legitimate reason".

Canada
In most public places in Canada a kirpan is allowed, although there have been some court cases regarding carrying on school premises. In the 2006 Supreme Court of Canada decision of Multani v. Commission scolaire Marguerite‑Bourgeoys the court held that the banning of the kirpan in a school environment offended Canada's Charter of Rights and Freedoms, and that the restriction could not be upheld under s. 1 of the Charter, as per R. v. Oakes. The issue started when a 12-year-old schoolboy dropped a 20 cm (8-inch) long kirpan in school. School staff and parents were very concerned, and the student was required to attend school under police supervision until the court decision was reached. A student is allowed to have a kirpan on his person if it is sealed and secured.

In September 2008, Montreal police announced that a 13-year-old student was to be charged after he allegedly threatened another student with his kirpan. The court found the student not guilty of assault with the kirpan, but guilty of threatening his schoolmates, and he was granted an absolute discharge on 15 April 2009.

On 9 February 2011, the National Assembly of Quebec unanimously voted to ban kirpans from the provincial parliament buildings. However, despite opposition from the Bloc Québécois, it was voted that the kirpan be allowed in federal parliamentary buildings.

As of 27 November 2017, Transport Canada has updated its Prohibited Items list to allow Sikhs to wear kirpans smaller than 6 cm in length on all domestic and international flights (except to USA).

Today, many Khalsa Sikhs in Canada freely wear their Kirpans in public. An example of this is Canadian politician Jagmeet Singh, who proudly wears his kirpan.

Denmark
On 24 October 2006, the Eastern High Court of Denmark upheld the earlier ruling of the Copenhagen City Court that the wearing of a kirpan by a Sikh was illegal, becoming the first country in the world to pass such a ruling. Ripudaman Singh, who now works as a scientist, was earlier convicted by the City Court of breaking the law by publicly carrying a knife. He was sentenced to a 3,000 kroner fine or six days' imprisonment. Though the High Court quashed this sentence, it held that the carrying of a kirpan by a Sikh broke the law. The judge stated that "after all the information about the accused, the reason for the accused to possess a knife and the other circumstances of the case, such exceptional extenuating circumstances are found, that the punishment should be dropped, cf. Penal Code § 83, 2nd period."

Danish law allows carrying of knives (longer than 6 centimeters and non-foldable) in public places if it is for any purpose recognized as valid, including work-related, recreation, etc. The High Court did not find religion to be a valid reason for carrying a knife. It stated that "for these reasons, as stated by the City Court, it is agreed that the circumstance of the accused carrying the knife as a Sikh, cannot be regarded as a similarly recognisable purpose, included in the decision for the exceptions in weapon law § 4, par. 1, 1st period, second part."

India

Sikhism originated in India during the Mughal era and a majority of the Sikh population lives in present-day India, where they form around 2% of its population.

Article 25 of the Indian Constitution deems the carrying of a kirpan by Sikhs to be included in the profession of the Sikh religion and not illegal. Sikhs are allowed to carry the kirpan on board domestic flights in India.

Italy

In 2015 an amritdhari Sikh was fined in the Lombard town of Goito, in Mantua province for carrying a kirpan. In 2017 Italy's higher appeal court, the Corte di Cassazione upheld the fine. Media reports have interpreted the sentence as instituting a generalized ban on the kirpan. Amritsar Lok Sabha  MP Gurjeet Singh Aulja met with Italian diplomats and was assured no generalized ban on kirpans is operative, and that the case had only specific relevance to a singular instance and carried no general applicability.

Sweden
Swedish law has a ban on "street weapons" in public places that includes knives unless used for recreation (for instance fishing) or profession (for instance a carpenter). Carrying some smaller knives, typically folding pocket knives, is allowed, so that smaller kirpans may be within the law.

United Kingdom

England and Wales
As a bladed article, possession of a kirpan without valid reason in a public place would be illegal under section 139 of the Criminal Justice Act 1988. However, there is a specific defence for a person charged to prove that he carries it for "religious reasons". There is an identical defence to the similar offence (section 139A) which relates to carrying bladed articles on school grounds. The official list of prohibited items at the London 2012 Summer Olympics venues prohibited all kinds of weapons, but explicitly allowed the kirpan.

Scotland
Similar provisions exist in Scots law with section 49 of the Criminal Law (Consolidation) (Scotland) Act 1995 making it an offence to possess a bladed or pointed article in a public place. A defence exists under s.49(5)(b) of the act for pointed or bladed articles carried for religious reasons. Section 49A of the same act creates the offence of possessing a bladed or pointed article in a school, with s.49A(4)(c) again creating a defence when the article is carried for religious reasons.

United States
In 1994, the Ninth Circuit held that Sikh students in public school have a right to wear the kirpan. State courts in New York and Ohio have ruled in favor of Sikhs who faced the rare situation of prosecution under anti-weapons statutes for wearing kirpans, "because of the kirpan's religious nature and Sikhs' benign intent in wearing them." In New York City, a compromise was reached with the Board of Education whereby the wearing of the knives was allowed so long as they were secured within the sheaths with adhesives and made impossible to draw. The tightening of air travel security in the twenty-first century has caused problems for Sikhs carrying kirpans at airports and other checkpoints. As of 2016, the TSA explicitly prohibits the carrying of "religious knives and swords" on one's person or in cabin baggage and requires that they be packed in checked baggage.

In 2008, American Sikh leaders chose not to attend an interfaith meeting with Pope Benedict XVI at the Pope John Paul II Cultural Center in Washington, D.C., because the United States Secret Service would have required them to leave behind the kirpan. The secretary general of the Sikh Council stated: "We have to respect the sanctity of the kirpan, especially in such interreligious gatherings. We cannot undermine the rights and freedoms of religion in the name of security." A spokesman for the Secret Service stated: "We understand the kirpan is a sanctified religious object. But by definition, it's still a weapon. We apply our security policy consistently and fairly."

See also
 Gatka
 Sant Sipahi

References

External links

 Explaining what the Kirpan is to a Non-Sikh.
 Press release VDPA Human Rights Conference, Vienna, Austria
 Sword in Sikhism 
 About the 5 K´s

Indian melee weapons
Sikh religious clothing
Ceremonial knives
Punjabi words and phrases
Daggers
Blade weapons
Religious objects
Weapons of India